Deir Alla (Arabic: دير علا) is the site of an ancient Near Eastern town in Balqa Governorate, Jordan. The Deir Alla Inscription,  datable to ca. 840–760 BCE, was found here.

On 20 August 2010, it recorded a scorching temperature of 51.1 °C, the new official highest temperature in the history of Jordan.

Identification 
Deir Alla has been suggested to be the biblical Sukkot in Transjordan. Some believe it to be the biblical Pethor.

It was also suggested by an early traveler to the site, Selah Merrill, who found parallels with names in the Hebrew Bible.

Archaeology
The tell is 50 by 200  meters and rises to 27 meters above the plain. A series of Dutch excavations sponsored by the Netherlands Organisation for the Advancement of Pure Research began in 1960, under the auspices of the department of theology, University of Leiden. These excavations continued for five seasons until 1967. The excavation made its most dramatic discovery in 1967, an ink wall inscription relating a hitherto-unknown prophecy of Balaam, who thereby becomes the first Old Testament prophet to be identified in an inscription. After a long interruption, work resumed in 1976, initially under Franken, for several seasons. After another long break, occasional seasons were conducted beginning in 1994 until 2008.

At the end of the 1964 campaign, 11 clay tablets, 3 inscribed in a West Semitic Early Caananite script, 7 bearing only dots, and one uninscribed, were discovered. The tablets were found in the destruction layer of storerooms dated by a cartouche of Queen Twosret of Egypt to around 1200 BC. Earlier objects were also found there so the tablets may well predate the destruction. In the later excavations several more clay tablets were found, for a total of 15.

The Balaam inscription
The 1967 excavation revealed a many-chambered structure that had also been destroyed by earthquake, during the Persian period at the site. On a wall was written a story relating visions of the seer of the gods "Balʿam son of Beʿor" (Balaam son of Beor), who may be the same Balʿam son of Beʿor mentioned in Numbers 22–24 and in other passages of the Bible. The Deir Alla Balaam is associated with "a god bearing the name Shgr, 'Shadday' gods and goddesses, and with the goddess Ashtar."

It reflects the oldest example of story from a biblical book (Numbers) written in a West Semitic alphabetic script, and is considered the oldest piece of West Semitic literature transmitted in a still debated Semitic language. The Deir Alla Inscription is datable to ca. 840–760 BCE; it was written in red and black inks on a plastered wall; 119 pieces of inked plaster were recovered. The wall, near the summit of the tell, was felled by yet another tremor.

History
The town was a sanctuary and metal-working centre, ringed by smelting furnaces built against the exterior of the city walls,  whose successive rebuildings, dated by ceramics from the Late Bronze Age, sixteenth century BCE, to the fifth century BCE, accumulated as a tell based on a low natural hill. The hopeful identification of the site as the biblical Sukkot is not confirmed by any inscription at the site.

Deir Alla was the first Bronze Age city excavated in Jordan. The initial expectations were of establishing a relative chronology of Palestine pottery in the transition between the Bronze Age to the Iron Age, established through meticulous stratigraphy. It was intended to span a gap between established chronologies at Jericho and Samaria.

The oldest sanctuary at Deir Alla dates to the Late Bronze Age; it was peacefully rebuilt at intervals, the floor being raised as the tell accumulated height, and the squared altar stone renewed, each new one placed atop the previous one. The final sanctuary was obliterated in a fierce fire; the blackened remains of an Egyptian jar bearing the cartouche of Queen Twosret gives a terminus post quem of c. 1200 BCE, a date consonant with other twelfth-century urban destruction in the Ancient Near East. Unlike some other destroyed sites, Deir Alla's   habitation continued after the disaster, without a break, into the Iron Age; the discontinuity was a cultural one, with highly developed pottery of a separate ceramic tradition post-dating the destruction.

Ayyubid/Mamluk era
A sugar mill, dating from the Ayyubid/Mamluk era, was in use in the village until 1967.

Ottoman era
It had a population of 46 Muslim households and 4 Muslim bachelors. They paid a taxes on various  agricultural products, including wheat, barley, sesame, cotton, goats and beehives, in addition to  occasional revenues, water buffalos and a water mill; a total of  10,500 akçe.

Modern era
The Jordanian census of 1961 found 1,190 inhabitants in Deir Alla.

Tourist attractions
As well as being the site of the Deir Alla Inscription, Deir Alla is also the site of Battle of Fahl between the Muslim Caliphate and the Byzantine Empire. There are several tombs of Sahabah (followers of Muhammad) in Deir Alla:

 Abu Ubaidah ibn al-Jarrah
 Dhiraar bin Al-Azwar
 Sharhabeel ibn Hasana

Notes

Bibliography

     

Een Verhalla voor het Oprapen. Opgravingen de Deir Alla in de Jordaanvallei, Leiden: Rijksmuseum van Oudheden, 1989.

See also
Cities of the ancient Near East

External Links
Photos of Deir Alla at the American Center of Research

Populated places in Balqa Governorate
Archaeological sites in Jordan
Former populated places in Southwest Asia
Late Bronze Age collapse